Octavius Terry (born November 7, 1972) is an American former hurdler.

He graduated from Creekside High School in Fairburn, Georgia in 1991.  He then went to Georgia Tech where he was the 1994 NCAA Champion in the 400 hurdles.  The following year was his peak year, finishing third at the 1995 USA Outdoor Track and Field Championships, qualifying him for the 1995 World Championships in Athletics.  He finished sixth in his semi-final race and did not advance to the final.  That same year he was a representative at the World University Games where he picked up a silver medal.  Two years later, he returned to the University Games, failing in the hurdles but winning a gold medal leading off the American 4x400 metres relay.

Personal life 
In 2019, Terry and his life partner Jamal Sims end their marriage.

References

1972 births
Living people
People from Fairburn, Georgia
Sportspeople from Fulton County, Georgia
Track and field athletes from Georgia (U.S. state)
American male hurdlers
African-American male track and field athletes
World Athletics Championships athletes for the United States
Universiade medalists in athletics (track and field)
Universiade gold medalists for the United States
Universiade silver medalists for the United States
Georgia Tech Yellow Jackets men's track and field athletes
Medalists at the 1995 Summer Universiade
Medalists at the 1997 Summer Universiade
21st-century African-American sportspeople
20th-century African-American sportspeople
LGBT African Americans
Gay men